Thomas Quirk is a corporate director of biotech companies and former board member of the Institute of Public Affairs, an Australian conservative think-tank for which he has written numerous articles and papers and provided comments to the media. Quirk joined the board of therapeutics company Sementis in 2011 as a non-executive director. Quirk is an occasional speaker on the topic of innovation in Australia, and has written extensively on subjects of energy policy and climate change. He is a former member of the Australian Climate Science Coalition's Scientific Advisory Panel. Quirk is a critic of Tim Flannery, the Climate Commission and environmentalists generally.

Career 
Quirk has worked for resources company, CRA (now known as Rio Tinto). He has also worked in the United States at Fermilab, the universities of Chicago and Harvard and at CERN in Europe. He was an early director of Biota, a company which developed an influenza drug. He has held several positions in utilities, electricity and transport industries including a founding directorship of the Victorian Power Exchange. Quirk was Deputy Chairman of VENCorp, which managed the transmission and wholesale natural gas market and system planning for the electricity market in Victoria, Australia. He is also a former Chairman of VicTrack, the owner of the state's railway assets.  Quirk also worked for James D. Wolfensohn in a venture capital fund based in New York City. Quirk was appointed as a Fellow of the Heide Museum of Modern Art in Victoria, of which he is a benefactor.

Political views 
Quirk is an advocate for the expansion of Australia's role in the nuclear fuel chain and has expressed support for the development of uranium enrichment capacity, spent fuel reprocessing and future storage of nuclear waste in Australia. One of the potential applications of nuclear energy in Australia is powering seawater desalination plants. He has also challenged the work of anti-nuclear activist, Helen Caldicott. Quirk contributed a chapter entitled Opportunities in the nuclear fuel cycle to the 2011 policy perspective publication Australia's nuclear options for the Committee for Economic Development of Australia (CEDA).

Between 2006 and 2011, Quirk wrote numerous articles for the website Online Opinion, including criticisms of wind power and renewable energy and pieces promoting nuclear power. Quirk is also a regular writer for Quadrant online. Quirk co-signed a letter to the UN Secretary General, rejecting the scientific consensus on climate change. Quirk's opinion editorials and analyses on topics of energy, energy policy and climate change have been frequently referred to and quoted by Andrew Bolt and republished and promoted by bloggers Joanne Nova and Jennifer Marohasy and think tanks including the Institute for Private Enterprise.

In 2014 Quirk described the carbon bubble as a "white elephant" and claims that while  in the atmosphere is increasing, atmospheric temperatures are remaining "dynamically stable." As of 2015, Quirk continues to express his views via opinion editorials, occasional interviews and speaking engagements. In 2015, Quirk spoke to the Australian Institute of International Affairs on the topic of technological innovation in Australia. In a 2015 study about bias in climate science, Quirk and co-authors concluded: "Because of the above bias errors the hypothesis of dangerous global warming caused by human activity has not been substantiated by evidential science."

Education 
Quirk trained as a nuclear physicist at the University of Melbourne, has attended the Harvard Business School and has been a Fellow of three Oxford Colleges.

Publications 
Chambers, J., Miller, A., Morgan, R., Officer, B., Rayner, M., Sellars-Jones, G., & Quirk, T. (2015), "Psychology Behavioural Economics and Climate Change", Energy & Environment, 26(8), pages 1353–1358.

Chambers, J., Miller, A., Morgan, R., Officer, B., Rayner, M., Sellars-Jones, G., & Quirk, T. (2013). "A Review of the Scientific Evidence Underlying the Imposition of a Carbon Tax or ETS in Australia", Energy & Environment, 24(6), 1013–1026.

Quirk, T. (2010). "Twentieth Century Sources of Methane in the Atmosphere", Energy & Environment, 21(3), 251–266. 
Quirk, T. (2009). "The Australian Temperature Anomaly, 1910 - 2000", Energy & Environment, 20(1/2), 97–100. 
Quirk, T. (2009). "Sources and Sinks of Carbon Dioxide", Energy & Environment, 20(1/2), 105–121.

References 

Living people
University of Melbourne alumni
Australian physicists
People associated with CERN
Year of birth missing (living people)
20th-century births